Franklin Turnpike may refer to:
Franklin Turnpike (Maryland)
Franklin Turnpike (New Jersey)